Protein deglycase DJ-1, also known as Parkinson disease protein 7, is a protein which in humans is encoded by the PARK7 gene.

Structure

Gene 

The gene PARK7, also known as DJ-1, encodes a protein of the peptidase C56 family. The human gene PARK7 has 8 Exons and locates at chromosome band 1p36.23.

Protein 
The human protein deglycase DJ-1 is 20 kDa in size and composed of 189 amino acids with seven β-strands and nine α-helices in total and is present as a dimer.  It belongs to the peptidase C56 family of proteins.

The protein structures of human protein DJ-1, Escherichia coli chaperone Hsp31, YhbO and YajL and an Archaea protease are evolutionarily conserved.

Function 

Under an oxidative condition, protein deglycase DJ-1 inhibits the aggregation of α-synuclein via its chaperone activity, thus functioning as a redox-sensitive chaperone and as a sensor for oxidative stress. Accordingly, DJ-1 apparently protects neurons against oxidative stress and cell death. In parallel, protein DJ-1 acts as a positive regulator of androgen receptor-dependent transcription. DJ-1 is expressed in both the neural retina and retinal pigment epithelium of mammals, where it exerts a neuroprotective role against oxidative stress under both physiological and pathological conditions.

Pyrroloquinoline quinone (PQQ) has been shown to reduce the self-oxidation of the DJ-1 protein, an early step in the onset of some forms of Parkinson's disease.

Functional DJ-1 protein has been shown to bind metals and protect against metal-induced cytotoxicity from copper and mercury.

DJ-1/Park7 and its bacterial homologs Hsp31, YhbO and Yajl can repair methylglyoxal and glyoxal glycated nucleotides.  Guanine, either in the form of a free nucleotide or as a nucleotide incorporated into nucleic acid (DNA or RNA), if glycated, can be repaired by DJ-1/Park 7.  Deglycase-deficient bacterial mutants with reduced ability to repair glycated bases in DNA show strong mutator phenotypes.

Clinical significance 

Defects in this gene are the cause of autosomal recessive early-onset Parkinson's disease 7.

Interactions 

PARK7 has been shown to interact with:
 CASK,
 EFCAB6,  and
 PIAS2.

See also 
Parkinson's disease

References

Further reading

External links